The 2006 United States House of Representatives elections in Texas were held on November 7, 2006, to determine the 32 U.S. Representatives from the state of Texas, one from each of the state's 32 congressional districts. These elections coincided with the 2006 midterm elections, which included a gubernatorial election and an election to the U.S. Senate.

Texas underwent a second round of mid-decade redistricting as a result of the Supreme Court case League of United Latin American Citizens v. Perry. The court had ruled that District 23 violated the Voting Rights Act. Due to this ruling, the 15th, 21st, 23rd, 25th, and 28th districts were redrawn after the primary election had occurred, voiding the results. These districts instead conducted special elections concurrent with the general elections. This election marks the first time Democrats made a net gain of seats over Republicans since the 1992 elections.

Overview

(*elections in the 15th, 21st, 23rd, 25th, and 28th were conducted under the Nonpartisan blanket primary format)



District 1
Freshman Congressman Louis Gohmert (R-Tyler), elected in 2004 after redistricting in East Texas, faced Roger Owen (D) of Hallsville in the general election, along with Libertarian nominee Donald Perkinson. Gohmert was one of four Republicans who succeeded in defeating incumbent Democrats with help from a controversial redistricting effort orchestrated by former House Majority Leader Tom DeLay.

District 2
In 2004, Ted Poe (R-Humble) unseated Democrat Nick Lampson after heavy redistricting changed the political landscape, allowing him to win with 55% of the vote. His opponent in November was Democrat Gary Binderim, along with the Libertarian Justo J. Perez.

District 3
Incumbent Sam Johnson (R-Plano) faced Dan Dodd, Democrat from McKinney, and Libertarian Christopher J. Claytor in the general election. This district is dominated by the Republican stronghold of Collin County, as well as Garland, another large Dallas suburb.

District 4
25-year incumbent Ralph Hall (R-Rockwall), who switched from the Democratic Party shortly before the 2004 election, faced Democrat Glenn Melancon of Sherman and Libertarian Kurt G. Helm.  Though it is best known as the district of the well known former Speaker Sam Rayburn, and thus a long Democratic stronghold, the southern end of the district consists of Republican-dominated Dallas suburbs.

District 5
Incumbent Jeb Hensarling (R-Dallas) faced Democrat Charlie Thompson of Athens in the general election, along with Libertarian Mike Nelson.

District 6
Joe Barton (R-Ennis), who has represented the Sixth District since 1985, faced Democrat David T. Harris of Arlington in November, along with Libertarian Carl Nulsen.

District 7
Incumbent John Culberson (R-Houston) faced Democratic teacher Jim Henley of Houston and Libertarian Drew Parks in the general election in November. The seventh district is one of the most heavily Republican districts in Texas yet it is mostly urban, as it is also one of the wealthiest districts in the country and includes several affluent areas of Houston, including the Upper Kirby, Uptown, Spring Branch-Memorial, and River Oaks neighborhoods, as well as the cities of West University Place, Bellaire, and Jersey Village.

District 8
Kevin Brady (R-The Woodlands), incumbent Congressman since 1996, faced Democrat James Wright of New Caney in November.

District 9
Freshman Democratic Congressman Al Green of Houston faced no opposition to his re-election.

District 10
Incumbent freshman Michael McCaul (R-Austin) faced some minor celebrity in that of 2004 Libertarian presidential nominee Michael Badnarik. Vietnam veteran Ted Ankrum of Houston ran as the Democratic nominee. McCaul was elected with no Democratic opposition in 2004, as the Libertarian candidate captured 15% of the vote (no Libertarian candidate in the entire state garnered more than 4% when running against both major parties). The 10th district spans a large swath of southeast and central Texas from eastern Austin to Harris County west of Houston.

District 11
Congressman Mike Conaway (R-Midland) ran unopposed in the general election.

District 12
Incumbent Congresswoman Kay Granger (R-Fort Worth) faced John R. Morris (D), also of Fort Worth, in the general election. Gardner Osborne received the Libertarian nomination.

District 13
Congressman Mac Thornberry (R-Amarillo) faced Roger Waun, Democrat from Wichita Falls, in this panhandle race. Jim Thompson represented the Libertarian Party in the election.

District 14
Congressman Ron Paul, the Republican from Surfside, faced Shane Sklar, Democratic nominee from Edna, to represent this coastal district, which stretches from Victoria and stretches in a northward and eastward direction to Fort Bend and Brazoria counties.

District 15
Four-term incumbent Congressman Rubén Hinojosa (D-McAllen) ran against Republicans Paul Haring and Eddie Zamora in a special election caused by court mandated redistricting in South Texas and the redrawing of the district's lines.

District 16
Democratic Congressman Silvestre Reyes of El Paso faced third-party opposition in the fall, in the form of Libertarian Gordon Strickland. The 16th District is heavily Democratic and comprises mainly El Paso, which is heavily Hispanic.

District 17

Incumbent Chet Edwards (D-Waco) won reelection by a 51% to 48% margin in 2004 after the 2003 Texas redistricting changed his exurban Central Texas district substantially and made it more Republican, he also pulled off the victory despite the fact Bush won the district by a margin of 40%. His district includes Waco and Crawford, the location of George W. Bush's ranch, Prairie Chapel Ranch. With his district stretched to include his alma mater of Texas A&M University, he was able to pull off a narrow victory in 2004. He was also helped by the fact that his opponent, then-State Representative Arlene Wohlgemuth, was nominated only after a nasty, expensive primary. This year, he was challenged by Republican Van Taylor, an attorney and Iraq War veteran from a prominent family in Waco. Guillermo Acosta also ran as the Libertarian nominee.

District 18
Incumbent Sheila Jackson Lee (D-Houston) faced Republican Ahmad Hassan to represent this largely Democratic and urban Congressional seat in the heart of Houston. Patrick Warren was the Libertarian nominee.

District 19
Congressman Randy Neugebauer (R-Lubbock), victorious in 2004 over fellow incumbent Congressman Charlie Stenholm (D-Abilene), faced Democrat Robert Ricketts, also of Lubbock, in November. Fred Jones was on the ballot as the Libertarian nominee.

District 20
Charlie Gonzalez (D-San Antonio) defended his Congressional seat against Libertarian Michael Idrogo. His district covers much of inner city San Antonio, which is mostly Hispanic.

District 21
Lamar S. Smith (R-San Antonio) was running against San Antonio Democrat John Courage in the general election, along with James Arthur Strohm, the Libertarian nominee. The district was changed somewhat in the federal court remapping mandated by the Supreme Court and attracted several new candidates for the special election ensued as a result of the boundary change after the party primaries took place. Candidates included Democratic perennial candidate Gene Kelly, along with Independent candidates Tommy Calvert, James Lyle Peterson, and Mark Rossano. Smith won a majority of votes and avoided a December runoff.

District 22

Retiring incumbent Tom DeLay (R-Sugar Land) had been facing mounting ethical challenges and corruption charges in recent months, and won reelection by a surprisingly small 55% to 41% margin in 2004, even though George W. Bush carried the suburban Houston district with 64%. On September 28, 2005, DeLay was indicted by a grand jury in Travis County. As a result, he felt forced to step down from his post as House Majority Leader. In announcing his plans not to seek reelection, Delay noted his poor poll showing and the constant criticisms he was expecting. DeLay declared himself ineligible for the race on Tuesday, April 4 by attempting to officially change his residence to Virginia. "Those polls showed him beating Democrat Nick Lampson in the general election but in a race that would be too close for comfort, DeLay said."  . 

DeLay's district faced a strong challenge from former Rep. Nick Lampson, a Democrat whose district he dismantled during the 2003 mid-decade redistricting. Lampson's former district contained much of the eastern area of DeLay's present district.

Libertarian Bob Smither also ran for the 22nd district of Texas. 

The Republican nomination to replace DeLay was prevented by a court ruling that mandated that DeLay could not be replaced on the ballot. As a result, Texas Attorney General Greg Abbott, who previously sent out telephone calls encouraging Republicans to vote for DeLay in the primary, called for DeLay's name to be removed from the ballot and replaced with another GOP candidate. The court order was upheld by a panel of the Fifth Circuit Court and appeal to the Supreme Court refused by Justice Antonin Scalia. DeLay then filed to withdraw his name from the ballot to allow the GOP to rally behind another candidate.

The Texas GOP then decided to attempt to rally behind a write-in candidate, choosing Houston City Councilwoman Shelley Sekula-Gibbs during a meeting of precinct chairs in the 22nd district on August 17. The presumed favorite before the denial of the appeal, Sugar Land mayor David Wallace, filed as a write-in candidate with the Texas Secretary of State before the meeting, vowing to run even without the support of the GOP.

District 23

The 23rd district was among five districts holding a special election on November 7, the same day as the general election. The race pitted all certified candidates against one another in each district, regardless of party.

The reason for this arrangement stems from the controversial 2003 Texas redistricting plan which was ruled unconstitutional with respect to the 23rd district by the Supreme Court in League of United Latin American Citizens v. Perry.  The Court ruled that the plan was a racial gerrymander; specifically that it lowered the Hispanic population percentage in the district to the extent that it unconstitutionally diminished the constituency's political influence.  The 23rd had to be redrawn, and, in all, five districts were effected, and all primary results from those districts were vacated.  The new lines effected mostly the 23rd and 28th districts.

The incumbent in the 23rd was Congressman Henry Bonilla (R-San Antonio).  His opponent originally was Rick Bolanos, 57, Democrat from El Paso, who was to be Bonilla's challenger before the district was redrawn and forced the new elections.  As redrawn, however, Bonilla's district included the home of Democratic ex-Congressman Ciro Rodriguez, who jumped into the race, after losing his primary challenge against Henry Cuellar in the 28th district.

District 23's election was the only one to advance to a runoff, which was held on December 12.

District 24
Incumbent Kenny Marchant (R-Coppell), ran to keep his seat in Congress against Democrat Gary Page of Irving and the Libertarian nominee Mark Frohman.

District 25

Incumbent Congressman Lloyd Doggett (D-Austin) originally was slated to have no major party opposition in the fall. The 25th district formerly stretched from Austin to the Mexican border, but has been redrawn for the 110th Congress to be more compact and completely in the central part of the state. 

As this district was redrawn after the party primaries took place, a special election ensued in November, meaning that instead of a plurality required for victory, a majority was required. If no candidate received a majority, the top two contenders would meet in a runoff election in December. He was opposed by Republican Grant Rostig, Libertarian Barbara Cunningham, and Independent Brian Parrett.

District 26
Congressman Michael C. Burgess (R-Lewisville) was challenged by Democrat Tim Barnwell of Denton, along with Libertarian Rich Haas. The Denton County-centered district is strongly Republican.

District 27
Incumbent Solomon P. Ortiz (D-Corpus Christi) ran for reelection against Republican William Vaden, also of Corpus Christi. They were joined on the ballot by Libertarian Robert Powell.

District 28
Congressman Henry Cuellar (D-Laredo) had no opposition from Republicans in November. However, a recent Supreme Court ruling struck down Texas' 23rd District, which is located next to this district, as an unconstitutional racial gerrymander resulting from the controversial 2003 Texas redistricting efforts coordinated by House Majority Leader Tom DeLay and the Republican-controlled legislature. 

Cuellar's power base in Laredo was consolidated in the resulting remap and thus will not face Congressman Bonilla, as had been speculated as a scenario. This election was a special election, as the district was drawn after the party primaries, and Cuellar was faced by fellow Democrat Frank Enriquez and Constitution Party candidate Ron Avery. The Libertarian nominee did not re-file to run in the special election.

District 29
Congressman Gene Green (D-Houston) ran against Republican Eric Story, also of Houston, in the November general election. Clifford Lee Messina, a Libertarian, rounded out the ballot. This district contains several heavily Hispanic neighborhoods in inner-city Houston, as well as several blue-collar eastern suburbs of Houston, including Pasadena, Channelview and Baytown, which are home to a strong majority of the Houston area's petrochemical refineries.

District 30
Incumbent Congresswoman Eddie Bernice Johnson (D-Dallas) faced Republican Wilson Aurbach in the general election, along with Ken Ashby, the Libertarian nominee. The 30th District contains the southern and downtown portions of Dallas, as well as several of its inner southern suburbs.  It is heavily Democratic.

District 31
Congressman John Carter (R-Round Rock) defended his Central Texas Congressional seat in November against Democrat Mary Beth Harrell of Gatesville and Libertarian Matt McAdoo. The largely Republican district consists of many northern Austin suburbs as well as the gigantic Fort Hood military base.

District 32
Incumbent Pete Sessions (R-Dallas), who defeated longtime Democratic Congressman and fellow incumbent Martin Frost in a contentious reelection in the 2004 redistricting aftermath, faced Democrat Will Pryor for the right to represent this suburban Dallas district. Joining the two was Libertarian John Hawley.

References

2006
Texas

United States House of Representatives